Nathan Tracy Carr (December 25, 1833 – May 28, 1885) was an American lawyer and Civil War veteran who served briefly as a U.S. Representative from Indiana from 1876 to 1877.

Biography 
Born in Corning, New York, Carr attended the common schools, and was graduated from Starkey Academy in 1851.
He moved to Midland County, Michigan.
He studied law.
He was admitted to the Midland County bar in 1858 and commenced practice at Vassar, Michigan.
He served as member of the State house of representatives 1858-1860.
Recorder of Midland County in 1861 and 1862.

He served as a lieutenant in the Second Regiment, Michigan Volunteer Infantry, in 1862.
He moved to Columbus, Indiana, in 1867.

He served as prosecuting attorney for Bartholomew, Shelby, Jackson, and Brown Counties in 1870.

Congress 
Carr was elected as a Democrat to the Forty-fourth Congress to fill the vacancy caused by the death of Michael C. Kerr and served from December 5, 1876, to March 3, 1877.
He was an unsuccessful candidate for renomination in 1876.

Later career and death 
He resumed the practice of law in Columbus, Indiana.
He was appointed judge of the ninth judicial circuit court of Indiana in 1878.

He died in Columbus, Indiana, May 28, 1885.
He was interred in the City Cemetery.

References

1833 births
1885 deaths
People from Vassar, Michigan
People from Midland County, Michigan
Union Army officers
Democratic Party members of the United States House of Representatives from Indiana
Politicians from Corning, New York
19th-century American politicians
People from Columbus, Indiana
Military personnel from Michigan
19th-century American lawyers